Santiago García Aracil (28 May 1940 – 28 December 2018) was a Spanish Catholic archbishop.

Biography 
García Aracil was born in Valencia, Spain and was ordained to the priesthood in 1963. He served as titular bishop of Croæ and auxiliary bishop of the Roman Catholic Archdiocese of Valencia, Spain, from 1984 to 1988. He then served as bishop of the Roman Catholic Diocese of Jaén, Spain, from 1988 to 2004. Finally he served as archbishop of the Roman Catholic Archdiocese of Mérida-Badajoz, Spain, from 2004 to 2015, when he resigned for reasons of age.

Notes

1940 births
2018 deaths
21st-century Roman Catholic archbishops in Spain
20th-century Roman Catholic bishops in Spain
Bishops of Jaén
Bishops appointed by Pope John Paul II
People from Valencia